Grouse Lodge is a recording studio near Rosemount, County Westmeath, Ireland.  Designed by Andy Munro it has two studios and living quarters in nine stone outhouses, integrating the existing 275-year-old stone structure.

Artists 
It has recorded artists such as Westlife, Sam Fender, Bell X1, McFly ("Motion In The Ocean"), Snow Patrol (Eyes Open, A Hundred Million Suns),Editors (An End Has A Start), Bloc Party (A Weekend in the City), Laminate, Duman (Duman I and Duman II) Doves, Manic Street Preachers (tracks from their Lifeblood and Send Away The Tigers albums), Muse (Absolution) and Royseven (The Art of Insincerity) and Michael Jackson. R.E.M. used the studio to record some of Accelerate, their 14th studio album.

Awards 
Irish - Winner
World Young Business Achievers Award 2004 - Winner

References

External links
 Grouse Lodge Recording Studio's Homepage - www.grouselodge.com

Recording studios in Ireland
Buildings and structures in County Westmeath